Swapnil Kusale is a shooter of Indian origin who hails from Maharashtra.

Career 
Kusale was born in 1995, in the family of a farmer. In 2009, his father enrolled him into Maharashtra government's primary pogamme dedicated to Sports, Krida Prabhodini. After one year of hardcore physical training, he had to choose one sport and he chose shooting. In 2013, he became sponsored by Lakshya Sports.

In 2015, he won gold in 50m rifle prone 3 in the junior category in 2015 Asian Shooting Championships in Kuwait.
He also won the 59th National Shooting Championship held in Tughlakabad ahead of Gagan Narang and Chain Singh in 50m rifle prone event. He repeated the same performance in 61st National Championship in Thiruvananthapuram by winning a gold in 50m rifle 3 position.

References

Indian male sport shooters
1995 births
Living people